John Constable (alias Lacey; pen-name Clerophilus Alethes) (10 November 1676 or 1678, in Lincolnshire – 28 March 1743) was an English Jesuit controversial writer.

Life
In 1695 he entered the Society of Jesus. For many years he served the Fitzherbert family at Swinnerton, where he is buried.

Works
Constable's chief controversial opponents were:
 the Abbé Courayer (1681–1776) who championed Anglican orders, came over to England in 1728, was lionized, and eventually buried in the cloisters of Westminster; and
 Charles Dodd, a pseudonym of Hugh Tootell, who wrote, Constable maintained, with a prejudice against Jesuits.

The chief writings of Constable are:

 "Remarks on Courayer's Book in Defense of English Ordinations, wherein their invalidity is fully proved", an answer to Courayer's "Dissertations" of 1723;
 "The Stratagem Discovered to show that Courayer writes 'Booty', and is only a sham defender of these ordinations", by "Clerophilus Alethes" (8vo, 1729), against Joseph Trapp, The Church of England Defended Against the Calumnies and False Reasoning of the Church of Rome (1727):
 "Doctrine of Antiquity concerning the Eucharist" by "Clerophilus Alethes" (8vo, 1736);
 "Specimen of Amendments proposed to the Compiler of 'The Church History of England'", by "Clerophilus Alethes" (12mo, 1741);
 "Advice to the Author of 'The Church History of England'", manuscript at Stonyhurst.

Joseph Gillow enumerates a few other writings by Constable.

References

Attribution
 The entry cites:
Oliver, Collectanea S.J., 73;
Henry Foley, Records S.J., III, 207; VII (i), 159;
Sommervogel, Bibliothèque de la C. de J., II col. 1374;
Joseph Gillow, Dict. of Eng. Cath., I, 552, sqq.;

Year of birth uncertain
1670s births
1743 deaths
18th-century English writers
18th-century English male writers
18th-century English Jesuits
Clergy from Lincolnshire
17th-century English Jesuits